Law on Copyright and Related Rights is the name given to the copyright law in several countries:

 Copyright law of Azerbaijan
 Copyright law of the Russian Federation
 Copyright law of Ukraine